Rodrigo García may refer to:

Rodrigo García (director) (born 1959), film and television director
Rodrigo García (author) (born 1964), Argentinian author
Rodrigo García Rena (born 1980), Spanish cyclist
Rodrigo Garcia (politician) (born 1974), Brazilian politician

See also
 García (surname)